Robert Guenette (January 12, 1935, Holyoke, Massachusetts – October 31, 2003, Los Angeles, California) was an American film producer, screenwriter, film director, television director and television producer, recipient of the Directors Guild of America Award.

Guenette is considered one of the first documentary directors to introduce the "newsreel style" in documentaries. He and his son, Mark, were co-founders of the International Documentary Association.

Filmography

Writer, cinema
 The Defector (1966)
 The Tree (1969)
 The Mysterious Monsters (1975)
 The Man Who Saw Tomorrow (1981)

Director, cinema
 The Tree (1969)
 The Mysterious Monsters (1975)
 The Man Who Saw Tomorrow (1981)

Director, TV documentaries
 Our War in Vietnam (1962)
 National Geographic Specials (1965, TV series)
 They've Killed President Lincoln! (1971)
 Appointment with Destiny (1971-1973, TV series, Guenette directed 4 episodes out of a total of 7, and wrote 2)
The Plot to Murder Hitler (1971) 
The Crucifixion of Jesus (1972)
Cortez and Montezuma: The Conquest of an Empire (1972)
Peary's Race for the North Pole (1973)
 The World Turned Upside Down (1973)
 Monsters! Mysteries or Myths? (1974)
 The Amazing World of Psychic Phenomena (1976)
 The Making of Star Wars (1977)
 Roots: One Year Later (1978)
 The Hanna-Barbera Hall of Fame: Yabba-Dabba-Doo 2 (1979)
 SP FX: The Empire Strikes Back (1980)
 Great Movie Stunts: Raiders of the Lost Ark (1981)
 Classic Creatures: Return of the Jedi (1983)
 Dinosaur! (1985)
 The Flintstones' 25th Anniversary Celebration (1986)
 Memories Then and Now (1988)
 Here's Looking at You, Warner Bros. (1991)
 Crazy About the Movies: Dennis Hopper (1991)
 Crazy About the Movies: Ava Gardner (1992)
 Orson Welles: What Went Wrong? (1992)
 Celebration of a Life: Steven J. Ross Chairman of Time Warner (1993)
 Golf: The Greatest Game (1994)
 Heroes of the Game (1994)
 Celebrate the Century (1999, TV mini-series documentary)
 Legends, Icons and Superstars of the 20th Century: Five Pop Music Icons (2001)

Director, TV movies
 Tears of Joy, Tears of Sorrow (1986)

Producer, TV movies
 Victory at Entebbe (1976)

Producer, TV series
 Winners (two episodes in 1977 and 1978 as executive producer)

Awards

Nominees
 1972: Primetime Emmy Award for Outstanding Achievement in Any Area of Creative Technical Crafts (for The Plot to Murder Hitler)
 1978: Daytime Emmy Award for Outstanding Children's Entertainment Special (for the episode "I Can" from the series Winners)
 1978: Daytime Emmy Award for Outstanding Children's Entertainment Special (for the episode "Journey Together" from the series Winners)
 1982: Primetime Emmy Award for Outstanding Informational Special (for Great Movie Stunts: Raiders of the Lost Ark)

Won
 1982: Directors Guild of America Award for Outstanding Directorial Achievement in Documentary (for Great Movie Stunts: Raiders of the Lost Ark)
 2001: International Documentary Association Pioneer Award

Notes

References

1935 births
2003 deaths
Deaths from brain cancer in the United States
Neurological disease deaths in California
Deaths from cancer in California
American film directors
American film producers
American television producers
American male screenwriters
Directors Guild of America Award winners
20th-century American male writers
20th-century American screenwriters